Agustín Fernando Bugallo (born 23 April 1995) is an Argentine field hockey player for who plays as a midfielder for Spanish División de Honor club Club de Campo and the Argentine national team.

Club career
Bugallo played for BHC and Mitre in Argentina until 2019. In July 2019, it was announced he would play for Pinoké in the Netherlands for the 2019–20 season. He joined HGC in the summer of 2020 after one season with Pinoké. He left the Netherlands after two seasons for Belgium to play for Gantoise in Ghent. After one season he left Gantoise for Club de Campo in Spain.

International career
Bugallo represented Argentina at the 2018 Men's Hockey World Cup. In July 2019, he was selected in the Argentina squad for the 2019 Pan American Games. They won the gold medal by defeating Canada 5-2 in the final.

References

External links

 Agustín Fernando Bugallo at the 2019 Pan American Games

1995 births
Living people
People from San Juan, Argentina
Argentine male field hockey players
Male field hockey midfielders
Competitors at the 2018 South American Games
2018 Men's Hockey World Cup players
Field hockey players at the 2019 Pan American Games
South American Games gold medalists for Argentina
South American Games medalists in field hockey
Pan American Games gold medalists for Argentina
Pan American Games medalists in field hockey
Men's Hoofdklasse Hockey players
Expatriate field hockey players
Argentine expatriate sportspeople in the Netherlands
HGC players
Medalists at the 2019 Pan American Games
Men's Belgian Hockey League players
Field hockey players at the 2020 Summer Olympics
Olympic field hockey players of Argentina
La Gantoise HC players
Argentine expatriate sportspeople in Belgium
Argentine expatriate sportspeople in Spain
Club de Campo Villa de Madrid players
División de Honor de Hockey Hierba players
2023 Men's FIH Hockey World Cup players